Kristiansand Gladiators is the name of an American football team located in Kristiansand, Norway that competes in the Norway American Football Federation.  The team plays its home games at Karuss Colosseum in Vågsbygd, Kristiansand. They also have a reputation for having some of the loudest fans in the league.

External links
Kristiansand Gladiators Official Website
NoAFF Official Website

American football teams in Norway